Leo Tateusz Sugar (April 6, 1929 – September 23, 2020) was an American professional football player who was a defensive end in the National Football League (NFL) for the Chicago/St. Louis Cardinals, Philadelphia Eagles, and the Detroit Lions.  He went to two Pro Bowls during his nine-year career.  Sugar played college football at Purdue University, where he was an All-Big Ten Defensive End and was named to the College All-Star Game.  He was named to the 1951 All-American and was drafted in the eleventh round of the 1952 NFL Draft.  He was born in Flint, Michigan and played football and basketball for the Flint Northern Vikings in high school as well as a local American Legion baseball team. He died in September 2020 at the age of 91.

References

External links
Entry at FindAGrave.com

1929 births
2020 deaths
Players of American football from Flint, Michigan
American football defensive linemen
Purdue Boilermakers football players
Chicago Cardinals players
St. Louis Cardinals (football) players
Philadelphia Eagles players
Detroit Lions players
Eastern Conference Pro Bowl players
American people of Polish descent